Gonzalo Contreras is a Chilean writer. In 1991 he won the first edition of El Mercurios Concurso de Novela Inédita (unpublished novel competition) with La ciudad anterior. He went on to publish El nadador in 1994 and El gran mal in 1998. In 2004 he published Natural Law, and, 9 years later, its second part, Mecanica Celeste. During 20 years he has imparted a literary workshop, bombastically considered the most prestigious in Chile. Literary critic Catholic priest Ignacio Valente described Contreras' prose as very good, as opaque in the best sense, like that of Kafka.

References

20th-century Chilean novelists
20th-century Chilean male writers
Chilean male novelists
Living people
Year of birth missing (living people)
21st-century Chilean novelists
21st-century Chilean male writers